BumperCar is a Mac OS X web browser by Freeverse Software that is aimed at kids. BumperCar contains extensive parental controls including filtering, personal information blocking, whitelists, blacklists, time limits and full support for ICRA tags. Version 2 is based on WebKit as well as some technologies from The Omni Group.

Reference

External links
 BumperCar

Freeverse Inc. games
MacOS web browsers
MacOS-only software